Enrique Roberto Gámez Quintero (born July 13, 1981) is an Ecuadorian footballer who plays for Rocafuerte.

Honors
LDU Quito
Serie A: 2010
Recopa Sudamericana: 2010

References

External links
Gámez's FEF Player Card 

1981 births
Living people
Sportspeople from Esmeraldas, Ecuador
Association football fullbacks
Ecuadorian footballers
L.D.U. Portoviejo footballers
C.D. Cuenca footballers
Barcelona S.C. footballers
C.S.D. Macará footballers
L.D.U. Quito footballers
Mushuc Runa S.C. footballers
Ecuador international footballers